Givaldo Barbosa (born January 25, 1954) is a former professional tennis player from Brazil.  

Most of his tennis success was in doubles. During his career, he won three doubles titles.  He achieved a career-high doubles ranking of World No. 32 in 1985.

Career finals

Doubles (3 titles, 2 runner-ups)

References

External links
 
 

Brazilian male tennis players
Tennis players from São Paulo
Living people
1954 births